The 2017 Clásica de San Sebastián was a road cycling one-day race that took place on 29 July in San Sebastián, Spain. It was the 37th edition of the Clásica de San Sebastián and the twenty-sixth event of the 2017 UCI World Tour.

The race was won by 's Michał Kwiatkowski in a five-rider group sprint, ahead of former race winners Tony Gallopin and 's Bauke Mollema.

Teams
As Clásica de San Sebastián was a UCI World Tour event, all eighteen UCI WorldTeams were invited automatically and obliged to enter a team in the race. Two UCI Professional Continental teams –  and  – competed, completing the 20-team peloton.

Result

References

External links

2017
2017 UCI World Tour
2017 in Spanish road cycling
July 2017 sports events in Spain